e-junior is the first UAE children TV channel created by e-Vision which is part of Etisalat the largest telecom operator in the Middle East. "e-junior" was launched in the year 2001, it targets kids up to 14 years old. the channel content is a mix of educational, fun, adventurous and fantasy programs.

"e-junior" is available on eLifeTV the IPTV service from Etisalat in the UAE, eLife channel number 333.

History 
e-junior was launched on 15 January 2001 at 12:00 pm. The channel's launch coinciding with Humaid Rashid Sahoo cutting a cake during a children's carnival at the Magic Planet Golf Course at Deira City Centre.

New look 
On 15 January 2009, e-junior got a new logo and branding. It now has four mascots: Red, Blue, Orange, and Green each represent programming content type throughout the day. Red is for Movies. Blue is for preschool shows. Orange is for live-action shows and Green is for animation shows.

See also 
Etisalat

References

External links

Children's television networks
Television channels and stations established in 2001
Television stations in the United Arab Emirates
2001 establishments in the United Arab Emirates